Pulchrocladia ferdinandii is a species of lichen in the family Cladoniaceae. It was first formally described as Cladonia ferdinandii by Swiss lichenologist Johannes Müller Argoviensis in 1882. The specific epithet honours German-Australian botanist Ferdinand von Mueller, who collected the type specimen near Esperance, Western Australia. Rex Filson transferred the taxon to Cladia in 1970. In 2018, it was transferred to the newly circumscribed genus Pulchrocladia.

Secondary compounds occurring in the lichen include atranorin, ursolic acid, and usnic acid. Pulchrocladia ferdinandii has an Australian distribution. It has been recorded from Australian Capital Territory, New South Wales, Queensland, South Australia, and Western Australia.

References

Cladoniaceae
Lichen species
Lichens described in 1882
Lichens of Australia
Taxa named by Johannes Müller Argoviensis